Lénárd Borbély (born August 5, 1981) is a Hungarian politician, member of the National Assembly (MP) for Csepel (Budapest Constituency XXX) between 2010 and 2014. He was a member of the Defence and Internal Security Committee since May 17, 2010.

Borbély was elected Mayor of Csepel (District XXI, Budapest) during the 2014 local elections, replacing fellow Fidesz member Szilárd Németh.

References

1981 births
Living people
Fidesz politicians
Members of the National Assembly of Hungary (2010–2014)
People from Oradea